Kuti or Küti may refer to:

People
Sándor Kuti (1908-1945), Hungarian-Jewish composer
Ransome-Kuti family, a prominent Nigerian family
Fela Kuti, musician and prominent figure in Afrobeat music

Places
Kuti, Bileća, a village in Bosnia and Herzegovina
Kuti, Herceg Novi, a village in Montenegro
Küti, Lääne-Viru County, a village in Estonia
Küti, Kareda, a village in Estonia
Kuti (Sokolac), a village in Bosnia and Herzegovina
Nyalam Town, a Tibetan town formerly known as Kuti
Nyalam Tong La, a mountain pass in the Himalayas also known as Kuti Pass
An upper tributary of the Sharda River in Uttarakhand, India
Kuthi Valley

Other uses
Kuti, Ngarrindjeri name for the Australian edible clam Plebidonax deltoides 
KUTI, a sports radio station in Yakima, Washington
Coffee-leaf tea, traditional Ethiopian tisane made from steeped coffee leaves